
This is a list of Portuguese musicians in alphabetical order.

A
 A Naifa
 The Act-Ups
 Amália Rodrigues
 Amélia Muge
 Ana Moura
 António Variações
 António Vitorino de Almeida
 António Zambujo
 Aurea

B
 Banda do Casaco
 Blasted Mechanism
 Blind Zero
 Brigada Victor Jara
 Bunnyranch

C
 Carminho
 Clã
 Cool Hipnoise
 Corvos
 Camané
 Carlos do Carmo
 Carlos Paredes
 Cristina Branco

D
 David Fonseca
 Dazkarieh
 Da Vinci
 Da Weasel
 Dealema
 Delfins
 Deolinda 
 Doce
 Dead Combo

E
 Expensive Soul

F
 Fausto Bordalo Dias

 Fernando Tordo
 Fingertips

G
 The Gift
 Gisela João
 GNR
 Green echo

H
 Hands on Approach
 Heróis do Mar
 Humanos

J
 Jorge Palma
 José Afonso
 José Mário Branco

K
 Katia Guerreiro

L
 Legendary Tigerman
 Loto

M
 Madredeus
 Mafalda Arnauth
 Mafalda Veiga
 Mão Morta
 Mariza
 Mediterrânic Ensemble
 Moonspell

N
 Nonstop

O
 Ocaso Épico
 Ornatos Violeta

P
 Paco Bandeira
 Paulo de Carvalho
 Paulo Gonzo
 Pedro Abrunhosa
 Pólo Norte
 Primitive Reason

Q
 Quarteto 1111
 Quinta do Bill

R
 Rouxinol Faduncho
 Rui Penha
 Rui Veloso

S
 Sérgio Godinho
 Sétima Legião
 Silence 4
 Stockholm Lisboa Project
Salvador Soblar

T
 The Gift
 Toranja

U
 UHF
 Underground Sound of Lisbon

V
 Vitorino

W
 Wraygunn

X
 Xutos e Pontapés
 X-Wife

Portuguese musicians
Portuguese
Musicians